Peter Reuther (February 8, 1836August 6, 1905) was a German American immigrant, carpenter, and Republican politician.  He was a member of the Wisconsin State Assembly, representing southern Manitowoc County during the 1872 session.

Biography
Reuther was born on February 8, 1836, in Laubach, in the Grand Duchy of Hesse (now central Germany).  He emigrated to the United States with his parents in 1854, settling first in Sheboygan, Wisconsin.  At Sheboygan, Reuther went to work as a carpenter and soon moved to the town of Centerville, Manitowoc County, Wisconsin, where he was a contractor.  He also became involved in local politics in Centerville, and was elected to seven terms as town clerk.

During the fourth year of the American Civil War, Reuther was drafted into the Union Army and was enrolled in Company B of the 45th Wisconsin Infantry Regiment.  Reuther was promoted to first sergeant shortly after the regiment mustered into federal service.  The 45th Wisconsin Infantry was sent to Nashville, Tennessee, and remained there on guard duty until the end of the war.

Reuther returned from the war and became involved with the Republican Party of Wisconsin.  He was elected to the Wisconsin State Assembly in 1871, running on the Republican Party ticket.  During the 1872 session, he represented Manitowoc County's first Assembly district, which then comprised roughly the southern half of the county.  He ran for re-election in 1872, but was defeated by Democrat Charles Rudolph Zorn.  He was twice a candidate for sheriff, but was not elected.

Later in life he moved to Brillion, Wisconsin, in Calumet County, where he worked as a liquor wholesaler and retailer.  He was also elected commander of Grand Army of the Republic post 222.

He died at his home in Brillion on August 6, 1905.

Personal life and family
Peter Reuther was the fourth of five children born to George Reuther and his wife Anna Margaretha ( Mickel).  Reuther's parents and all five children emigrated to the United States.  His younger brother, Jacob, served in the 5th Pennsylvania Cavalry Regiment in the Civil War.

Peter Reuther married Augusta Rossberg, another German immigrant, on October 28, 1861.  They had seven children.  His second son, George, later served as register of deeds for Manitowoc County.

Electoral history

Wisconsin Assembly (1871, 1872)

| colspan="6" style="text-align:center;background-color: #e9e9e9;"| General Election, November 7, 1871

| colspan="6" style="text-align:center;background-color: #e9e9e9;"| General Election, November 5, 1872

References

External links
2manitowoc.com

1836 births
1905 deaths
People from Laubach
Hessian emigrants to the United States
People from Centerville, Manitowoc County, Wisconsin
Republican Party members of the Wisconsin State Assembly
People of Wisconsin in the American Civil War
Union Army non-commissioned officers
19th-century American politicians